Merchant Shipping Act (with its variations) is a stock short title used in Malaysia and the United Kingdom for legislation relating to merchant shipping.

Merchant shipping acts and regulations also exist as well in other countries, and they are sometimes referred to as "Merchant Shipping Act" such as in Malta, India, Singapore, Kenya and South Africa. Each country has its specific rules regarding merchant shipping.

List

Malaysia
The Merchant Shipping (Oil Pollution) Act 1994

United Kingdom
The Merchant Shipping Act 1786
The Merchant Shipping Act 1844
The Merchant Shipping Law Amendment Act 1853 (16 & 17 Vict c 131)
The Merchant Shipping Repeal Act 1854 (17 & 18 Vict c 120)
The Merchant Shipping Act 1854
The Merchant Shipping Act 1876
The Merchant Shipping Act 1894 (57 & 58 Vict c 60)
The Merchant Shipping Act 1897 (60 & 61 Vict c 59)
The Merchant Shipping (Exemption from Pilotage) Act 1897 (60 & 61 Vict c 61)
The Merchant Shipping (Liability of Shipowners) Act 1898 (61 & 62 Vict c 14)
The Merchant Shipping (Mercantile Marine Fund) 1898 (61 & 62 Vict c 44)
The Merchant Shipping (Liability of Shipowners and others) Act 1900 (63 & 64 Vict c 32)
The Merchant Shipping Act 1906 (6 Edw 7 c 48)
The Merchant Shipping (Amendment) Act 1920 (10 & 11 Geo 5 c 2)
The Merchant Shipping (Scottish Fishing Boats) Act 1920 (10 & 11 Geo 5 c 39)
The Merchant Shipping Act 1921 (11 & 12 Geo 5 c 28)
The Merchant Shipping (Equivalent Provisions) Act 1925 (15 & 16 Geo 5 c 37)
The Merchant Shipping (International Labour Conventions) Act 1925 (15 & 16 Geo 5 c 42)
The Merchant Shipping (Safety and Load Line Conventions) Act 1932 (22 & 23 Geo 5 c 9)
The Merchant Shipping (Carriage of Munitions to Spain) Act 1936
The Merchant Shipping Act 1948 (11 & 12 Geo 6 c 44)
The Merchant Shipping (Safety Convention) Act 1949 (12, 13 & 14 Geo 6 c 43)
The Merchant Shipping Act 1950 (14 Geo 6 c 9)
The Merchant Shipping (Liability of Shipowners and Others) Act 1958 (6 & 7 Eliz 2 c 62)
The Merchant Shipping Act 1964 (c 47)
The Merchant Shipping Act 1965 (c 47)
The Merchant Shipping (Load Lines) Act 1967 (c 27)
The Fishing Vessels (Safety Provisions) Act 1970 (c 27)
The Merchant Shipping Act 1970 (c 36)
The Merchant Shipping (Oil Pollution) Act 1971 (c 59)
The Merchant Shipping Act 1974 (c 43)
The Merchant Shipping (Safety Convention) Act 1977 (c 24)
The Merchant Shipping Act 1979 (c 39)
The Merchant Shipping Act 1981 (c 10)
The Merchant Shipping (Liner Conferences) Act 1982 (c 37)
The Merchant Shipping Act 1983 (c 13)
The Merchant Shipping Act 1984 (c 5)
The Merchant Shipping Act 1985
The Safety at Sea Act 1986 (c 23)
The Merchant Shipping Act 1988 (c 12)
The Merchant Shipping (Registration, etc.) Act 1993 (c 22)
The Merchant Shipping (Salvage and Pollution) Act 1994 (c 28)
The Merchant Shipping Act 1995 (c 21)
The Merchant Shipping and Maritime Security Act 1997 (c 28)
The Merchant Shipping (Pollution) Act 2006 (c 8)

"The Merchant Shipping Acts"

Each Merchant Shipping Act defines a collective title beginning "Merchant Shipping Acts", including itself and other Acts whose short titles include "Merchant Shipping"; for example "The Merchant Shipping Acts 1894 to 1994". The earliest Act included is always the Merchant Shipping Act 1894.

See also
List of short titles

References

Lists of legislation by short title and collective title
Shipping in the United Kingdom